Maqbarat-o-shoara (Persian: مقبرةالشعرا) or the Mausoleum of Poets (Persian:  Mazār-e Shāerān or  Mazār-e Sorāyandegān) is a Maqbara (graveyard) belonging to classical and contemporary poets, mystics and other notable people, located in the Surkhab district of Tabriz in Iran. It was built by Tahmaseb Dolatshahi in the mid-1970s while he was the Secretary of Arts and Cultures of East Azarbaijan.

On the east side of Sayyed Hamzeh's grave and Ghaem Magham's grave, there is a graveyard containing the graves of important poets, mystics, scientists and well-known people of Tabriz. The Mausoleum was first mentioned by the medieval historian Hamdollah Mostowfi in his Nozhat ol-Gholub.  Hamdollah mentions it being located in what, at the time, was the Surkhab district of Tabriz. 

Since the 1970s, there have been attempts to renovate the graveyard area. Some work has been carried out like the construction of a new symbolic building on this site.

The first poet buried in this complex is Asadi Tusi.

Notable burials 
 Asadi Tusi (999–1072) – poet
 Qatran Tabrizi (1009–1072) – poet
 Anvari Abivardi (1126–1189) – poet
 Khaqani (1122–1190) – poet
 Mojireddin Bilaqani (d. 1190) – poet
 Zahir-al-Din Faryabi (d. 1202) – poet
 Shapur Nishapuri (d. 1204) – poet
 Shamseddin Sojasi (d. 1206) – poet
 Zulfaqar Shirvani (d. 1290) – poet
 Humam-i Tabrizi (1238–1314) – poet
 Nasrollah Tabib (d. 1339) – calligrapher
 Assar Tabrizi (1325–1390) – poet
 Maghrebi Tabrizi (1348–1406) – poet
 Mani Shirazi (d. 1507) – poet
 Lesani Shirazi (d. 1533) – poet
 Shakibi Tabrizi (d. 1564) – poet
 Mirza Issa Farahani (d. 1822) – vizier of Fath-Ali Shah Qajar and Abbas Mirza
 Aziz Khan Mokri (d. 1870) – army general
 Seqqat ol–Eslam Tabrizi (1861–1911) – Persian constitutional activist
 Taher Tabrizi (1888–1976) – calligrapher
 Mohammad-Hossein Shahriar (Shahriar) (1906–1988) – poet
 Mahmoud Melmasi (Azarm) (1917–1991) – poet
 Aziz Dowlatabadi (Darvish) (1922–2009) – poet

See also 
 The Amir Nezam House
 Behnam House
 House of Seghat ol Islam
 Constitutional House of Tabriz
 Seyed Hamzeh shrine

References 
 http://www.eachto.ir

Cemeteries in Iran
Architecture in Iran
Buildings and structures in Tabriz
Tourist attractions in Tabriz